Kalle Lyytinen (born August 19, 1953 in Helsinki) is the Iris S. Wolstein Professor of Management Design at Case Western Reserve University's Weatherhead School of Management, where he is also director of their Doctor of Management program. His research focuses on how organizations design and manage digital innovations. Lyytinen is notable for his breadth of scholarship and leadership in the field of Information Systems. In 2013, he received the Association for Information Systems Leo Award, which is the association's top honor.

Background
Lyytinen is notable for his breadth of scholarship and leadership in the field of Information Systems. In 2013 he received the Association for Information Systems Leo Award, which is the association's top honor. A study published in 2016 found that Lyytinen was the field's most central researcher - essentially the Paul Erdos of Information Systems. He is the former Editor-in-Chief of the Journal of the Association for Information Systems.

Lyytinen has written over 300 scholarly publications.  Notable books include: Information Systems : The State of the Field, with John Leslie King, published by John Wiley & Sons in 2006, and, Information Systems Development and Data Modeling - Conceptual and Philosophical Foundations, with Rudy Hirschheim and Heinz Klein, published by Cambridge University Press in 1995/2008.

Lyytinen received his PhD, Econ Lic, and MS from the University of Jyvaskyla (Finland), and has received honorary doctorates from Umeå University (Sweden), Copenhagen Business School (Denmark), and Lappeenranta University of Technology (Finland).

References 

1953 births
Living people
Case Western Reserve University faculty
Information systems researchers